Robbie Keane, an Irish professional footballer, is the Republic of Ireland national football team's top scorer, with 68 goals in 146 appearances. Keane made his international debut in a 2–1 defeat against the Czech Republic in March 1998, and scored his first international goals on his fifth appearance, a UEFA Euro 2000 qualifying 5–0 victory over Malta. He became Ireland's all-time leading scorer in October 2004, when he scored twice against the Faroe Islands during the qualification for the 2006 FIFA World Cup, passing Niall Quinn's record of 21 goals in 91 games.  In June 2013, Keane also became Ireland's most capped player on his 126th appearance, in a 2014 FIFA World Cup qualification match against the Faroes.  He is one of six Republic of Ireland players with 100 or more caps (four of whom are still active), and has also captained his national team over 50 times.

Keane has scored three international hat-tricks, the first coming against San Marino in November 2006. His second hat-trick came in June 2013, against the Faroes, while his third was against Gibraltar in October 2014.  The latter made Keane the highest scorer in the history of UEFA European Championship qualifying competitions, with 21 goals, overtaking the previous record holder, Hakan Şükür of Turkey.  Keane is also one of twelve players to have scored in three consecutive World Cup finals matches;  he scored one goal each against Germany and Saudi Arabia in the group stage, and against Spain in the knockout stage of the 2002 FIFA World Cup.

Keane has scored more goals against the Faroes and Gibraltar (five) than against any other national team. More than half of his goals (41) were scored in home fixtures, played in three venues: Lansdowne Road, Croke Park and Aviva Stadium.

Keane played his final match for the Republic of Ireland in August 2016, in a 4–0 victory over Oman, in a friendly at the Aviva Stadium, Dublin, scoring once with his 68th and final international goal for his country.

International goals
Scores and results list Republic of Ireland's goals first.  Score column indicates score after each Keane goal. Updated as of 31 August 2016.

Hat-tricks

Statistics

See also
List of Republic of Ireland national football team hat-tricks
List of top international men's association football goal scorers by country
List of men's footballers with 50 or more international goals

References

Republic of Ireland national football team records and statistics
Keane